Herbert Leonhardt (27 January 1925 – July 1986) was a German skier. He competed in the Nordic combined event at the 1956 Winter Olympics.

References

External links
 

1925 births
1986 deaths
German male Nordic combined skiers
Olympic Nordic combined skiers of the United Team of Germany
Nordic combined skiers at the 1956 Winter Olympics
Place of birth missing